Maurice Parkin is an English former professional snooker player.

Career

Parkin turned professional in 1971, entering the 1972 World Championship that season. He won his first qualifying round match 11–10 against Geoff Thompson, but was defeated in his next, 3–11 by the young Alex Higgins.

In 1973, Parkin lost 3–9 to Warren Simpson in the last 24, exiting the 1974 tournament at the same stage, 5–8 to Marcus Owen. In 1978, Parkin won his first match in six years, defeating Bernard Bennett 9–4 to set up a last-24 meeting with Bill Werbeniuk, which he lost 2–9.

Parkin never won another match, notably being whitewashed 9–0 by John Virgo in qualifying for the 1979 World Championship. The closest he came to achieving another victory was in the last 128 at the 1987 British Open; there, he led John Hargreaves 4–2, but lost 4–5.

Parkin's final match was symbolic of his career; in qualifying for the 1990 World Championship, he lost 0–10 to nineteen-year-old Barry Pinches. Having been ranked 91st in the world for the 1984/1985 season, he had fallen to 135th by this time, and although he remained on the tour as a non-active member until 1992, Parkin left the professional game in 1990.

References

English snooker players
Living people
Year of birth missing (living people)